Rainbow's Sunset is a 2018 Filipino family drama LGBT-themed film directed by Joel Lamangan, starring Eddie Garcia, Tony Mabesa, and Gloria Romero.

The movie is an official entry to the 2018 Metro Manila Film Festival, and bagged 11 awards, making it MMFF 2018's big winner.

Plot
The film tells the story of 84-year-old Ramon who comes out as gay to his children, to take care of his cancer-stricken lover, Fredo. Each of his children has his or her own troubles and victories, and so does his wife, Sylvia and he was torn between his duty on his family, and his true love. In flashbacks, Ramon was a student funded by Fredo's family. He fell in love with Fredo, who helped him launch a political career. In 1969, their affair is discovered by Ramon's wife, Sylvia, who accepts Fredo when he assures her that he shares his love for Ramon with those he loves. In the present day, Ramon moves to Fredo's home to take care of him, scandalizing his adult children, who try to cover up their relationship when Ramon and Fredo show up at an event. Furious, the couple storm off. Ramon shortly dies afterwards and the children, realizing how much their relationship meant, accompany Sylvia who decides to care for Fredo in Ramon's place.

Cast

Main cast
Eddie Garcia as Ramoncito "Ramon" Estrella
Tony Mabesa as Alfredo "Fredo" Veneracion
Gloria Romero as Sylvia Estrella

Supporting cast
Tirso Cruz III as Emmanuel "Emman" Estrella
Aiko Melendez as Georgina "George" Estrella
Sunshine Dizon as Marife "Fe" Estrella
Max Collins as Young Sylvia
Shido Roxas as Young Ramon
Ross Pesigan as Young Fredo
Jim Pebanco as Benjamin "Ben" Cruz
Albie Casiño as Jonel
Sue Prado as Nena
Tanya Gomez as Merly
Marcus Madrigal as Andy
Adrian Cabino as Jairus
Zeke Sarmenta as Lara
Noel Comia Jr. as Rufus
Nella Marie Dizon as Bessie
Ali Forbes as Cathy

References

External links

Philippine romance films
Philippine LGBT-related films
2018 LGBT-related films
LGBT-related drama films
Films directed by Joel Lamangan